Verbal may refer to:

People
Verbal (rapper) (born 1975), Japanese rapper and music producer

 Verbal Kent (born 1978), alternative hip hop artist from Chicago
 Verbal Jint (born 1980), South Korean musician, rapper and record producer

Language
 Something expressed with speech, rather than writing
 Pertaining to verbs
 Verbal noun, a noun formed from a corresponding verb
 A nonfinite verb such as an infinitive, gerund, or participle functioning as a noun, adjective, or adverb
 A word or group of words that functions as the head of a verb phrase
 Person characterised by verbosity or fluency
 Anything pertaining to language or the use of words, as opposed to nonverbal communication

Other uses
 Roger "Verbal" Kint, a character in the 1995 film The Usual Suspects
 Verbal, a magazine published by the Verbal Arts Centre, Northern Ireland
 Verbal, a track on Amon Tobin's EP Verbal Remixes & Collaborations

See also 
 
 Procès-verbal, a legal term with a number of meanings
 Verbal abuse (disambiguation)
 Verbal agreement (disambiguation)